Most municipalities in Iceland include more than one settlement. For example, four localities (Selfoss, Stokkseyri, Eyrarbakki, and Tjarnabyggð) can all be found in the municipality of Árborg.

A number of municipalities only contain a single locality, while there are also a few municipalities in which no localities exist. All localities in Iceland can only be located within a single municipality, i.e. they cannot straddle multiple municipality borders.

Some municipalities, such as Hafnarfjörður and Akranes, also share the same name with a locality. However, these localities are not always situated in their namesake municipalities. In those cases, this does not necessarily mean that they there are no other localities included in that particular municipality. Even when they are the only locality there, they do not always encompass the span of that municipality's entire land area.

List of localities 
The majority of the functions that are carried out by local governments actually happen at the municipal level. However, most settlements in Iceland are broken down further into the "locality" level, which are mainly used for information collection and statistical analysis purposes only—they are the regional equivalent of a census division.

See also
Government of Iceland
Administrative divisions of Iceland
Regions of Iceland
Municipalities of Iceland
Largest metropolitan areas in the Nordic countries

References

External links

Municipalities and Urban Settlements in Iceland
Regions of Iceland

Populated places in Iceland
Iceland
Cities